Peter H. Rowe (birth registered first ¼ 1947) is a Welsh rugby union and professional rugby league footballer who played in the 1960s, 1970s and 1980s.

Background
Peter Rowe's birth was registered in Swansea, Wales.

Playing career

International honours
Peter Rowe won 6-caps for Wales (RU) at Youth level while at Swansea 1963…1965, captaining the 1965/6 Wales Youth team, won caps for Wales (RL) while at Wigan, Blackpool Borough, and Huddersfield 1969…1979 7-caps + 3-caps (interchange/substitute), including while at Blackpool Borough in the 1975 Rugby League World Cup against Australia, England, and Australia.

BBC2 Floodlit Trophy Final appearances
Peter Rowe played , i.e. number 5, in Wigan's 7-4 victory over St. Helens in the 1968 BBC2 Floodlit Trophy Final during the 1968–69 season at Central Park, Wigan on Tuesday 17 December 1968, and played left-, i.e. number 4, in the 6-11 defeat by Leigh in the 1969 BBC2 Floodlit Trophy Final during the 1969–70 season at Central Park, Wigan on Tuesday 16 December 1969.

References

 Match programme – Wales vs New Zealand (2 November 1975)
 Peter H Rowe, 2011

External links
Statistics at wigan.rlfans.com
Team – Past Players – R at swansearfc.co.uk
Profile at swansearfc.co.uk

1947 births
Living people
Blackpool Borough players
Cardiff City Blue Dragons players
Footballers who switched code
Huddersfield Giants players
Rugby league centres
Rugby league locks
Rugby league players from Swansea
Rugby league second-rows
Rugby union players from Swansea
Swansea RFC players
Wales national rugby league team players
Welsh rugby league players
Welsh rugby union players
Wigan Warriors players